The Birds is a suite for small orchestra by the Italian composer Ottorino Respighi.  Dating from 1928, the work is based on music from the 17th and 18th-century and represents an attempt to transcribe birdsong into musical notation, and illustrate bird actions, such as fluttering wings, or scratching feet. The work is in five movements:

 "Prelude" (based on the music of Bernardo Pasquini)
 "La colomba" ("The dove"; based on the music of Jacques de Gallot)
 "La gallina" ("The hen"; based on the music of Jean-Philippe Rameau)
 "L'usignuolo" ("The nightingale"; based on the folksong "Engels Nachtegaeltje" transcribed by recorder virtuoso Jacob van Eyck)
 "Il cucù" ("The cuckoo"; based on the music of Pasquini)

The suite was used for the ballet of the same name, with choreography by Cia Fornaroli, first performed at Sanremo Casinò Municipale on 19 February 1933; with choreography by Margarita Wallmann at the Teatro Colón, Buenos Aires, on 27 February 1940; and by Robert Helpmann, with design by Chiang Yee, by the Sadler's Wells Ballet at the New Theatre, London on 24 November 1942.

Between 1965 and 1977 the first movement was used as the opening and closing theme for BBC TV series Going for a Song.  The music played along with the sound of a bird in a cage automaton.

Instrumentation
Woodwinds: 2 Flutes (2nd doubling Piccolo), Oboe, 2 Clarinets, 2 Bassoons
Brass: 2 Horns, 2 Trumpets
Keyboard: Celesta
Strings: Harp, 1st and 2nd Violins, Violas, Cellos, Double Basses

References

External links
 San Diego Symphony program notes, November 2006
 Free scores at IMSLP

Compositions by Ottorino Respighi
1927 compositions
Orchestral suites
Compositions for symphony orchestra
Music about birds